The Photo Album is the third studio album by indie rock band Death Cab for Cutie, released October 9, 2001 on Barsuk Records.

The albums spawned three singles: "A Movie Script Ending", "I Was a Kaleidoscope", and "We Laugh Indoors". All of the singles charted on the UK Singles Chart, with the highest-charting song "I Was a Kaleidoscope" peaking at number 115. The Photo Album was the first Death Cab for Cutie album to feature charting songs, with "A Movie Script Ending" also becoming the first of three songs by the band to eventually feature on the television show The O.C.. It was the only full-length album to feature drummer Michael Schorr.

A limited edition extended play called The Stability EP was released in early 2002, containing bonus tracks from the limited edition and Japanese versions of The Photo Album.

Reception

The Photo Album holds a score of 75 out of 100 from the review aggregating site Metacritic based on 17 reviews, indicating "generally favorable reviews". John D. Luerssen of Billboard gave the album a very favorable review and said, "If it's true that music of this nature doesn't get anymore heartfelt, it also rarely gets more infectious." Mojo wrote that the band "weave together smartly taut guitars with vivid observational lyrics to create perfectly crafted pop songs, stunning in their simplicity and beauty", while Alternative Press called the album "the skillful meshing of Benjamin Gibbard's part-stream-of-consciousness, part-confessional vocals with melancholy piano and achingly melodic guitars that reveal a fleshed-out Cutie are indeed a band of uncommon beauty." Nude as the News gave it a score of eight out of ten and stated, "While not every song is a gem, the ones that are have pushed the band's already high standard of compelling indie pop one notch higher." Neumu.net gave it seven stars out of ten and called it "evidence of a band that's maturing, slowing down and trying new things." Drawer B gave it a positive review and stated, "The most noteworthy aspect of The Photo Album is the band's upward trajectory. The music is cohesive and even, though still somewhat sluggish."

In a mixed assessment, Stephen Thompson of The A.V. Club wrote that the album "is often marked by pleasant but static, middle-of-the-road material." Melanie Haupt of The Austin Chronicle said, "It's a rare talent that can express such emotions so concisely; even more rare is the ability to deliver them in a near-whisper rather than a scream." Q wrote, "Full of beautiful pop songs, The Photo Album is just that—a collection of vignettes." Robert Christgau of The Village Voice gave the album a three-star honorable mention rating, indicating "an enjoyable effort consumers attuned to its overriding aesthetic or individual vision may well treasure".

Track listing

Personnel
Death Cab for Cutie
 Ben Gibbard – vocals, guitar, piano, organ
 Nick Harmer – bass guitar, organ
 Michael Schorr – drums, tambourine, shaker, loops
 Chris Walla – guitar, piano, loops

Additional personnel
 Sean Nelson – high vocals on "Blacking Out the Friction", harmony vocals on "I Was a Kaleidoscope"
 Jeff Saltzman – mastering
 John Vanderslice – low vocals on "Blacking Out the Friction", backing vocals on "I Was a Kaleidoscope"

References

External links
 

2001 albums
Death Cab for Cutie albums
Albums produced by Chris Walla
Barsuk Records albums
Fierce Panda Records albums